CO2 is a 2018 Burmese horror film based on a novel by Mi Mi. The film stars A Linn Yaung, Phway Phway, Kyaw Htet Aung and Yadanar Bo. The film produced by Dawei Film Production premiered in Myanmar on July 27, 2018.

Cast
 A Linn Yaung as Naung Naung
 Phway Phway as Thar Yar
 Kyaw Htet Aung as Arkar Soe Moe
 Yadanar Bo as Pone Pone

References

External links

2018 films
2010s Burmese-language films
Burmese horror films
Films shot in Myanmar
2018 horror films
Films directed by Wyne